Siruthai is a 2011 Indian Tamil-language action film written and directed by Siva. It is a remake of the 2006 Telugu film Vikramarkudu, directed by S. S. Rajamouli. It stars Karthi playing dual roles, alongside Tamannaah and comedian Santhanam.  The film was produced by K. E. Gnanavelraja and features music by Vidyasagar. The story revolves around "Rocket" Raja, a petty thief who comes across a little girl says that he's her father. When he learns the truth about his lookalike Rathnavel Pandian, who's an honest cop, he decides to turn a new leaf and help get rid of a crime gang.

It was released during Pongal on 14 January 2011. Generally the film got positive responses, the film was a success at the box office.

Plot
Rocket Raja is a pickpocket in Chennai who steals anything he comes across with his partner Kaatu Poochi. He enjoys his life to its fullest and goes to rob in a  marriage function. There he meets Swetha  and gets sexually aroused to her and pinches her hip ,to which she reciprocates.  However, his life changes when a small girl named Divya Rathinavel ends up in his care; she says that rocket raja looks exactly like her father, DSP Rathinavel Pandian IPS.

As Raja discovers the girl's past, it is revealed that Rathinavel is an honest policeman who is a nightmare to criminals, but the gang of criminals in the village of Devi Pattinam, Andhra Pradesh are intent on killing him and his daughter because he killed the son of a prominent criminal Bavuji, who also sexually abused women. Rathinavel's colleagues put Divya in Raja's care so that the criminals cannot take her. Rathinavel is on the verge of death following a gunshot to his head.

At first, Raja is angry with Divya and breaks her tape recorder. Divya is happy and hugs him after he repairs it. When Swetha comes to Raja's home with her parents, she sees Divya and thinks that she is the daughter of Raja and breaks up with him. Rathinavel is intent on fighting back. Unfortunately, he dies following a battle with several criminals who had been chasing Raja and Divya. From police officers, Raja realises that Rathinavel was an honest and courageous police officer who stood against Bavuji and his family, who had cruelly ruled a village. Rathinavel even manages to make his son die and stops their criminal acts. He also manages to fail Bavuji's brother Badra, but he gets shot when he tried to save a child.

Upon seeing his courage, Raja, with the help of Rathinavel's colleagues, steps into Rathinavel's shoes and finishes his unfinished work as he himself is a thug and destroys all their properties with the help of Kaatu Poochi in a hilarious way. There Swetha sees Raja, but he tries to escape from Swetha because he is now Rathinavel, so Swetha seduces him to which he tries to control himself in vain .She apologizes to him on learning the truth about Divya & her father Rathinavel and they reconcile.Raja then resumes his mission and goes on to kill Badra and takes on the responsibility of taking care of Divya, with the help of Swetha.

Cast

 Karthi as DSP Rathnavel Pandian and Rocket Raja (dual role) 
 Tamannaah as Swetha, Raja's Love Interest
 Santhanam as Kaatu Poochi, Raja's friend
 Baby Rakshana as Divya Rathinavel Pandian
 Avinash as Bavuji, a don of Devipattinam
 Rajiv Kanakala as Inspector Bharath
 Amit Tiwari as Munna, (Bavuji's son) 
 Supreeth as Bhadra, Bavuji's brother
 Manobala as Bhoom Bhoom, Bavuji's accountant 
 Meera Krishnan as Swetha's mother
 Santhana Bharathi as Home Minister
 Mayilsamy as Toilet Patron (IT Office)
 Meghna Nair as Jhansi
 Bhanu Chander as DGP
 Raghu Karumanchi as Acid Raja
 Prabhas Sreenu as Bavuji's henchman
 Fish Venkat as Bavuji's henchman
 Vinayakan as Henchman
 Meghna Naidu in a special appearance (Azhaga Poranthuputta item song)

Production
In 2008, reports emerged that Vikramarkudu would be remade in Tamil with Karthi. Ruthika and Anushka, who acted in original, were considered for the female leads. Suraj of Thalainagaram was said to be the director. VV Kathir who directed Jeeva starrer Thenavattu was also announced as director but Sivakumar advised Karthi to do strong characters before making a mark as action hero thus the project was dropped. The project was revived in 2010 and Siva, who directed films like Souryam and Sankham, was selected as director making his debut in Tamil. Tamannah was chosen as heroine after Paiyaa.

Music

The soundtrack album to the film was composed by Vidyasagar and features five songs. It was described as "bland" by Rediff, while Sify called it "catchy and youthful". Behindwoods gave a 2.5/5 rating, claiming that it "emphasizes the fact that it is a commercial entertainer. This may not be Vidyasagar's best album but he has given what the movie requires: A crisp album with short and sweet songs [...] Siruthai is a worthy listen to and must appeal to Karthi's fans is a huge way".

Reception

Critical response

Behindwoods gave a 2/5 rating and wrote: "Watch Siruthai if you are a hardcore mass masala fan. Since the originality of the Telugu version is retained, when released in Andhra this movie might serve as Karthi’s launch pad in Tollywood. Chances are that you might like Karthi, who is trying his best to prevent the movie from its impending dive into the depths of hackneyed void." Sify claimed that Siruthai had "come out as a festival bonanza for Tamil film goers. It is an unpretentious commercial pot boiler with ample doses of romance, comedy, action and emotion". Indiaglitz, another portal said "'Siruthai' is fit and fine for a good leap. With Karthi trying new vistas not missing out on the entertainment quotient, it is an obvious sweet pongal for masses this Pongal. Action and satisfaction is what 'Siruthai' is". N. Venkateswaran from the Times of India deemed a score of 2.5/5, citing that it "does not do anything for Karthi as an actor; what it does is to cement his position in the Tamil film industry as an actor who is a big draw at the box office". Malathi Rangarajan from The Hindu noted: "Generally, well-told cop stories don't bite the dust. Nor do dual role bonanzas. Going by the norm, this Siruthai should charge ahead!" Chennai Online stated: "Though the formula used in the flick could appeal to the masses, the director could have thought of some fresh sequences to make the movie more exciting". Oneindia.in remarked: "You can watch the film with your family because of the entertaining elements. It has a perfect mix of romance, action, fun, comedy, glamour and sentiments. It is a perfect Pongal treat for Kollywood audience. Do not miss this movie".

References

External links
 

2011 films
Indian action films
2011 action films
2011 masala films
Tamil remakes of Telugu films
Films shot in Andhra Pradesh
2010s Tamil-language films
Films set in Chennai
Films scored by Vidyasagar
Films directed by Siva (director)
Fictional portrayals of the Tamil Nadu Police
Indian police films
Films about lookalikes
2010s police films